Bharatiya Girvana Prouda Vidya Vardhini Shala is an institution and seminary of higher learning in Sanskrit, Vedanta, Mimamsa, literature and other allied subjects located in the premises of the Shankara Matha in Shankarapuram, Basavanagudi, Bangalore. It was inaugurated by Sri Sachhidananda Shivabhinava Narasimha Bharati Swaminah, the then Jagadguru of the Sringeri Sharada Peetham in 1910.

See also
Sringeri Sharada Peetham
Sadvidya Sanjivini Pathasala

Sringeri Sharada Peetham
1910 establishments in India